Somerset is a ceremonial county in South West England. It is a rural county of rolling hills, such as the Mendip Hills, Quantock Hills and Exmoor National Park, and large flat expanses of land including the Somerset Levels. Modern man came to what is now known as Somerset during the Early Upper Palaeolithic era. In the Neolithic era, from about 3500 BC, there is evidence of farming when people started to manage animals and grow crops on farms cleared from the woodland, rather than act purely as hunter gatherers. It is also likely that extraction and smelting of mineral ores to make tools, weapons, containers and ornaments in bronze and then iron started in the late Neolithic and into the Bronze and Iron Ages.

The construction of hillforts began in Britain in the Late Bronze and Early Iron Age, roughly the start of the first millennium BC. The reason for their emergence, and their purpose, has been a subject of debate. It has been argued that they could have been military sites constructed in response to invasion from continental Europe, sites built by invaders, or a military reaction to social tensions caused by an increasing population and consequent pressure on agriculture. The dominant view since the 1960s has been that the increasing use of iron led to social changes in Britain. Deposits of iron ore were separated from the sources of tin and copper necessary to make bronze, and as a result trading patterns shifted and the old elites lost their economic and social status. Archaeologist Barry Cunliffe believes that population increase played a role and has stated "the forts provided defensive possibilities for the community at those times when the stress of an increasing population burst out into open warfare. But I would not see them as having been built because there was a state of war. They would be functional as defensive strongholds when there were tensions and undoubtedly some of them were attacked and destroyed, but this was not the only, or even the most significant, factor in their construction".

There are numerous Iron Age hillforts and ancient settlement sites in the county, some of which were later reused in the Dark Ages, such as Cadbury Castle, Worlebury Camp and Ham Hill. Other hillforts, such as Small Down Knoll, Solsbury Hill, Dolebury Warren and Burledge Hill, may have had a domestic purpose as well as a defensive role. The Iron Age tribes of the Somerset area were the Dobunni in north Somerset, Durotriges in south Somerset and Dumnonii in west Somerset. Iron Age sites on the Quantock Hills, include major hillforts at Dowsborough and Ruborough, as well as smaller earthwork enclosures, such as Trendle Ring, Elworthy Barrows and Plainsfield Camp. In addition to the hillforts, several sites have been identified as settlements during the pre Roman period including Cambria Farm and the "Lake Villages" at Meare and Glastonbury which were built on a morass, on an artificial foundation of timber filled with brushwood, bracken, rubble and clay. Most of the sites fell out of use with the coming of the Romans and therefore this list covers those sites occupied until that time.

Almost all of the sites in the list are Scheduled Monuments. In the United Kingdom, a Scheduled Monument is a "nationally important" archaeological site or historic building, given protection against unauthorised change. Scheduled Monuments are specified in the Ancient Monuments and Archaeological Areas Act 1979, which defines a monument as:

Any building, structure or work above or below the surface of the land, any cave or excavation; any site comprising the remains of any such building, structure or work or any cave or excavation; and any site comprising or comprising the remains of any vehicle, vessel or aircraft or other movable structure or part thereof... (Section 61 (7)).

Damage to a scheduled monument is a criminal offence and any work taking place at one of these sites requires Scheduled Monument Consent from the Secretary of State. In England, the Department for Culture, Media and Sport keeps the register, or schedule, of nationally important sites which receive state protection, which now includes over 31,000 sites.

Known hillforts and settlements

Suspected hillforts and settlements

See also 

 List of hillforts in England
 List of castles in Somerset

References

External links 

 A map showing the hill forts and settlements in Somerset
 Another list of hill forts

Hill forts and ancient settlements
Somerset